Stanley H. Klein (October 15, 1908 – April 12, 1992) was a noted New York City architect.  The son of Hungarian immigrants, Ferdinand and Regina Neudorfer, he was a graduate of the Cooper Union for the Advancement of Science and Art and of New York University.

Among his most well-known designs was the single family, six room house shown at the 1959 American National Exhibition in Moscow, where Richard Nixon and Soviet leader Nikita S. Khrushchev held their televised "Great Kitchen Debate."  Designed to help the Soviet people get the feel of "an average American home," the house was similar to hundreds of homes he designed on Long Island and the New York metro area.

Larger Klein homes built in Jamaica, Queens, New York, and elsewhere featured a symmetrical colonial style; many of these larger brick homes still exist throughout Jamaica Estates and Queens.

He also designed the Hillcrest Jewish Center, the Queensboro Jewish Center and Temple Beth Sholom, all in Queens.

He was married for 50 years to Audrey Klein and had three children, Michael F. Klein, Roberta Klein, and David Klein, AIA.

References 
 "Stanley H. Klein Dies; Housing Architect, 83," The New York Times, April 17, 1992
 "Herbert Sadkin, 72, Former L.I. Developer," The New York Times, February 18, 1989

1908 births
1992 deaths
20th-century American architects
Architects from New York City
Cooper Union alumni
New York University alumni